The Asia/Oceania Zone is one of the three zones of regional Davis Cup competition in 2012.

In the Asia/Oceania Zone there are four different groups in which teams compete against each other to advance to the next group.

Teams
  (relegated to Group IV)
 
  (promoted to Group II)
  (relegated to Group IV)
 
 
  (promoted to Group II)

Format
The eight teams will be split into two pools of four, the top two nations will advance to the promotion pool. The two best teams from there will be promoted. The bottom two teams will play in a relegation pool, where the two last teams will be relegated.

It will played on the week commencing 25 April 2012 at Tehran, Iran and it will be played on outdoor hard court.

Group stage

Group A

Malaysia vs. Oman

Syria vs. Bangladesh

Malaysia vs. Syria

Oman vs. Bangladesh

Syria vs. Oman

Malaysia vs. Bangladesh

Group B

Iran vs. Vietnam

Vietnam vs. Kuwait

Iran vs. Kyrgyzstan

Iran vs. Kuwait

Vietnam vs. Kyrgyzstan

Kuwait vs. Kyrgyzstan

Promotion play-off

1st to 4th play-off

Iran vs. Syria

Kuwait vs. Malaysia

1st to 2nd play-off

Syria vs. Kuwait

3rd to 4th play-off

Iran vs. Malaysia

Relegation play-off

5th to 8th play-off

Vietnam vs. Bangladesh

Oman vs. Kyrgyzstan

5th to 6th play-off

Vietnam vs. Oman

7th to 8th play-off

Bangladesh vs. Kyrgyzstan

References

External links

Asia Oceania Zone III
Davis Cup Asia/Oceania Zone